Meysam Doraghi is an Iranian football midfielder who plays for Shahin Bushehr in the Persian Gulf Pro League.

Club career
Doraghi started his career with Esteghlal Ahvaz from youth levels. He promoted to first team in summer 2008. As summer 2013 he joined Naft Masjed Soleyman. He was a regular starter in 2013–14 season and helped Naft MIS in promoting to 2014–15 Iran Pro League. As summer 2014 he joined Esteghlal Khuzestan with a 3-years contract.

Club career statistics

Honours 
Esteghlal Khuzestan
Iran Pro League (1): 2015–16
Iranian Super Cup runner-up: 2016

References

External links
 Meysam Doraghi at PersianLeague.com
 Meysam Doraghi at IranLeague.ir

1990 births
Living people
Iranian footballers
Persian Gulf Pro League players
Azadegan League players
Esteghlal Ahvaz players
Esteghlal Khuzestan players
Khooshe Talaei players
People from Ahvaz
Association football midfielders
Sportspeople from Khuzestan province